Beth Ann Williams (born July 14, 1979) is an American lawyer who has served as a board member of the Privacy and Civil Liberties Oversight Board since 2022 and the United States Assistant Attorney General for the Office of Legal Policy from 2017 to 2020. In her role as Assistant Attorney General, Williams served as the primary policy advisor to the United States Attorney General and the United States Deputy Attorney General. Prior to her governmental work, she was a partner at the law firm of Kirkland & Ellis.

Education 
Williams graduated magna cum laude from Harvard College with a Bachelor of Arts degree in history and literature. She received her Juris Doctor from Harvard Law School, where she was president of the school's chapter of the Federalist Society. After completing law school, Williams served as a law clerk to Judge Richard C. Wesley of the United States Court of Appeals for the Second Circuit.

Career 
From 2005 to 2006, Williams served as Special Counsel to the United States Senate Committee on the Judiciary. In her role at the Senate Judiciary Committee, Williams assisted with the confirmations of Chief Justice of the United States John Roberts and Associate Justice Samuel Alito.

Williams became a litigation and appellate partner at Kirkland & Ellis, where her practice focused on complex commercial, securities, and First Amendment litigation. She was on the Kirkland team that represented Shirley Sherrod in her defamation lawsuit against Breitbart News. Her pro bono work included a United States Court of Appeals for the Second Circuit appointment to represent Patrick Proctor, a New York state inmate who had been held in solitary confinement for 18 years. Williams won a decision allowing Proctor to proceed with a challenge to his confinement. Williams also crafted six U.S. Supreme Court briefs at the certiorari and merits stages.

On June 12, 2017, President Donald Trump announced that he would nominate Williams to become the next United States Assistant Attorney General for the Office of Legal Policy. She was confirmed by the United States Senate on August 3, 2017, and sworn in on August 21, 2017.

On February 7, 2022, the Senate confirmed her to the PCLOB.

References

External links 
 Biography at U.S. Department of Justice

1979 births
Living people
21st-century American lawyers
Federalist Society members
People associated with Kirkland & Ellis
Harvard College alumni
Harvard Law School alumni
Lawyers from Washington, D.C.
People from Glen Ridge, New Jersey
Trump administration personnel
United States Assistant Attorneys General for the Office of Legal Policy
21st-century American women lawyers